Byala Municipality is a municipality (obshtina) in Ruse Province, Central-North Bulgaria, located in the Danubian Plain about 20 km southeast of Danube river. It is named after its administrative centre - the town of Byala.

The area is crossroads of some of the main directions in the country - road E85, road E83, I-51 and I-52, which connect the province centre of Ruse with the cities of Veliko Tarnovo, Pleven, Svishtov and respectively the country capital of Sofia and Shipka pass. Yantra river flows through the area from south to north.

Settlements 

Byala Municipality includes the following 11 places (towns are shown in bold):

Demography 
The following table shows the change of the population during the last four decades.

Religion 
According to the latest Bulgarian census of 2011, the religious composition, among those who answered the optional question on religious identification, was the following:

See also
Provinces of Bulgaria
Municipalities of Bulgaria
List of cities and towns in Bulgaria

References

External links
 Official website 

Municipalities in Ruse Province